John Clyde Morris III (born May 24, 1958) is a businessman and attorney from Monroe, Louisiana. A Republican, Morris has been a member of the Louisiana State Senate for the 35th district in North Louisiana since 2020. From 2012 until 2020, Morris was a member of the Louisiana House of Representatives from District 14, which encompasses Ouachita and Morehouse parishes in the northeastern portion of his state.

Background

Morris formerly worked on Capitol Hill in Washington, D.C., for former U.S. Senator J. Bennett Johnston, Jr., a Democrat. He was also a staff member at one time for the Louisiana Municipal Association. He is a partner of the law firm, Dean Morris, LLP.
 
Prior to residing in Monroe, Morris lived in St. Joseph in Tensas Parish, Rayville in Richland Parish, and New Orleans.

Unseating Sam Little

Morris won the state representative position in the general election held on November 19, 2011, when he unseated fellow Republican Sam Little, a retired farmer, originally from Bastrop in Morehouse Parish.  Morris polled 5,005 votes (59.1 percent) to Little's 3,463 ballots (40.9 percent). In the campaign for the heavily redistricted seat, Little and Morris accused each other of engaging in negative campaigning. Morris is a graduate of Louisiana State University and the Louisiana State University Law Center, both in Baton Rouge.
 
Morris led the three-candidate field in the primary held on October 22, with 5,078 votes (42.6 percent). Little trailed with 4,384 ballots (36.7 percent). A third Republican, Michael Echols, held the remaining but critical 2,471 votes (20.7 percent). Echols ran without opposition in the 2019 primary to choose Morris' House successor. From 1991 to 2008, the District 14 seat was held by the Democrat Charles R. McDonald of Bastrop in Morehouse Parish.

Legislative ratings, record and issues 
In May 2017, Morris opposed in the House Ways and Means Committee a plan by his Republican colleague, Rob Shadoin of Ruston which collectively would have raised taxes on businesses and lowered them for what Shadoin said would constitute 90 percent of individual taxpayers. When his measure was killed in committee, Shadoin said, "You can kiss tax reform goodbye." Four individual bills were combined into one on the advice of Shadoin's Democratic ally, Major Thibaut of New Roads. Morris said that the opponents of Shadoin's bill managed to stop the legislation on the premise that the measure "would not help the state's fiscal situation and would in fact make it worse. At the same time it would have made the tax code much more progressive (making higher income earners pay more) and would have eliminated the deduction for federal income. The committee didn't see the benefit from a set of bills that made the state fiscal situation worse in the name of purported tax reform."

References

1958 births
Living people
Republican Party members of the Louisiana House of Representatives
Republican Party Louisiana state senators
Businesspeople from Louisiana
Louisiana lawyers
Politicians from Monroe, Louisiana
People from St. Joseph, Louisiana
People from Rayville, Louisiana
Louisiana State University alumni
Louisiana State University Law Center alumni
21st-century American politicians